In 1915, the federal government acquired a white mansion on Kooyong Road, Caulfield named Glen Eira. It had been built and served as the town house of the Riverina pastoralist Henry Ricketson and his family.

No. 11 Australian General Hospital was opened on 17 April 1916 in the building. It was the largest of the three Victorian repatriation hospitals the federal government operated during World War 1. The Australian Red Cross built a 'Rest Home' near the original building in August 1916, where Red Cross volunteers could tend to recuperating servicemen.

A new tennis court was opened on 19 May 1917.

The facility was re-opened on 18 March 1918.

A committee led by Mrs Morris, wife of the Mayor of Caulfield, raised funds for the hospital in 1925.

Nurses' residence 'Caulfield House' opened in 1936 and was expanded in 1937.

The hospital was known at various times as Caufield Convalescent Hospital, Caufield Repatriation Hospital, Kooyong Military Hospital, and the General Military Hospital at Caulfield.

In 1948, management of much of the facility was assumed by the state government's Alfred Hospital.

The original Glen Eira mansion was demolished in 1965, and the Victorian government purchased the last parts of the site from the federal Repatriation Department. The state then opened the Southern Memorial Hospital here in 1968.

In 1979 the Red Cross Rest Home was renovated and transferred to the state government. This became the Montgomery Nursing Home in 2001. The building was granted a heritage listing by the state government in 2016.

The hospital continues to operate on its original site today, as Caufield Hospital. It retains a focus on rehabilitation.

References

Hospitals in Melbourne
Buildings and structures in the City of Glen Eira
Heritage-listed buildings in Melbourne
1916 establishments in Australia
Hospitals established in 1916